Riesen is a surname. Notable people with the surname include:

Michel Riesen (born 1979), Swiss ice hockey player
Phil Riesen (born 1943), American politician
House Riesen, noble house in fictional TV series, Dominion
Edward Riesen
Claire Riesen